Tanweer Ikram  (born 1965) is the deputy senior district judge (deputy chief magistrate). He studied at Wolverhampton Polytechnic where he obtained his LLB in 1988 and was called to the Bar at the Inner Temple in 1990. He was admitted as a solicitor of the Senior Courts in 1993.

Career 
Ikram started as a magistrates' clerk and joined Booth Bennett Solicitors in 1993. He became a partner at IBB Solicitors in 1997. From 2007 to 2009, he was a consultant at ABV Solicitors, practising as an advocate in criminal prosecution and defence work.

Ikram was appointed as a deputy district judge (Magistrates' Court) in 2003 and district judge (Magistrates' Court) in 2009. In 2015, he was appointed as an associate judge on the Sovereign Base Areas in Cyprus. In 2017, he was appointed deputy senior district judge (Magistrates' Court).

Honours 
Ikram received honorary Doctor of Law degrees from the University of West London and the University of Wolverhampton. He was appointed Commander of the Order of the British Empire (CBE) in the 2022 New Year Honours for services to judicial diversity.

References 

Alumni of the University of Wolverhampton
British solicitors
21st-century English judges
Living people
1965 births
Members of the Inner Temple
Commanders of the Order of the British Empire
British Cyprus judges